is a railway station on the Hakone Tozan Line in Hakone, Kanagawa, Japan, operated by the private railway operator Hakone Tozan Railway.

Lines
Ōhiradai Station is served by the Hakone Tozan Line. It is 9.9 km from the official starting point of the line at Odawara Station.

Station layout
Ōhiradai Station has two opposed side platforms. The small station building is built on one of the platforms.

Platforms

History
Ōhiradai Station opened on June 1, 1919.

Bus services
 Hakone Tozan Bus
"H" line for Hakone Machi Ko (Lake Ashi) via Miyanoshita, Kowakidani Station, Kowaki-en, Moto Hakone Ko (Hakone Shrine: Transfer for Sightseeing Cruise), Hakone Checkpoint
"T" line for Togendai (Lake Ashi: Transfer for Sightseeing Cruise) via Miyanoshita, Venetian Glass Museum, Sengoku (Transfer for Gotemba Premium Outlets and JR Gotemba Station; a gateway station for Mount Fuji and Fuji Five Lakes, including Lake Kawaguchi and Lake Yamanaka), Kawamukai (The Little Prince and Saint-Exupéry Museum), Senkyoro-mae (Transfer for Pola Museum of Art), Sengoku-kogen
"H" & "T" line For Hakone Yumoto Station, Odawara Station
 Izu Hakone Bus
"J" line for Kojiri via Miyanoshita, Kowakidani Station, Kowaki-en, Ōwakudani
"Z" line for Hakone Checkpoint via Miyanoshita, Kowakidani Station, Kowaki-en, Moto Hakone (Hakone Shrine)
"J" & "Z" line for Hakone Yumoto Station, Odawara Station

References

External links
 Hakone Tozan Railway Official Site
 Hakone Tozan Bus Official Site

Stations of Hakone Tozan Railway
Railway stations in Kanagawa Prefecture
Buildings and structures in Hakone, Kanagawa
Railway stations in Japan opened in 1919